Autism is a neurodevelopmental disorder diagnosed as impaired social interaction and communication, and by restricted and repetitive behavior. In this article, the word autism is used for referring to the whole range of conditions on the autism spectrum, which is not uncommon.

Working memory is the system that actively holds multiple pieces of transitory information in the mind, where they can be manipulated. This system has a limited capacity. Working memory is a part of the executive functions (EF), an umbrella term for cognitive processes that regulate, control, and manage other cognitive processes, for instance planning and attention.

Research connections 
A majority of the research has found that individuals with autism perform poorly on measures of executive function. A general decrease in working memory (WM) is one of the limitations, although some studies have found that working memory is not impaired in autistic children relative to controls matched for IQ. However, some evidence suggests that there may be minimal impairment in high-functioning autistic (HFA) individuals in that they have intact associative learning ability, verbal working memory, and recognition memory. In rare cases there are even instances of individuals possessing extremely good memory in constricted domains which are typically characterized as savants. Bennetto, Pennington and Rogers also suggest that WM deficits and limited EF is likely compounded by the onset of autism where early development yields hindrances in social interaction which typically (i.e. without impairment) improves both WM and EF. However, due to limited ability in interpreting social gestures and an impaired ability to process such information in a holistic and comprehensive manner, individuals with autism are subject to diminished and confounding instances of memory function and performance.

Physiological underpinnings 
The physical underpinnings of the cause for differences in the working memory of autistic people has been studied. Bachevalier suggests a major dysfunction in the brain of an autistic individual resides in the neural mechanisms of the structures in the medial temporal lobe (MTL) and perhaps, more specifically the amygdaloid complex. This may have implications in their ability to encode information because of the role the MTL and especially the hippocampal areas play in information processing DeLong reinforces this by suggesting autism to affect hippocampal function. Because the hippocampus is pivotal in memory encoding and modulating memory consolidation, any impairment can drastically affect an autistic individual's ability to process (i.e. multi-modal) and retain information. Sumiyoshi, Kawakubo, Suga, Sumiyoshi and Kasai have suggested that it is possible that the attenuated neural activities in parahippocampal regions might have something to do with the abnormal organization of information of individuals within the autistic spectrum. The left parahippocampal region (including the parahippocampal gyrus) has an implied role in sorting, relating, and sending information to the hippocampus and thus any abnormal activity or dysfunction within these regions might be accountable for the degree of effectiveness autistic individuals organize information. This is in keeping with other findings that suggest unconventional activity or lack of activity within the hippocampal regions which have a role in explaining some aspects of ASD.

Further evidence suggests that there is abnormal circuitry in what Brothers calls the neural basis for social intelligence, or holistically interpreting people's expressions and intentions. The interaction between the amygdala, the orbitofrontal cortex (OFC), and the superior temporal sulcus and gyrus (STG) enables one to process social information for personal interaction. In the case of autistic individuals there seems to be a limitation in these structures such that facial expressions, body language and speech expressions (ex. sarcasm) go consciously unnoticed, it is theorized that this could have something to do with the sagittal stratum, which is sometimes referred to as the "sarcasm center". However, Frith and Hill suggest that through 'remediation' or training that attends to specific traits in expressions, social understanding can be partially improved. The possibility of training in social understanding has given hope that there is a path that can be taken to reduce the social divide that is between children with autism and children who are neurotypical.

Characteristics

Global working memory characteristics 
Beversdorf finds that because autistic individuals are not as reliant on contextual information (i.e. comparing typically related schemas) to aid in memory consolidation, they are less likely to rely on semantically similar cues (ex. Doctor-Nurse vs. Doctor-Beach). Thus, an autistic individual would fare well on discriminating and recalling accurate items from false items.

Bennetto, Pennington and Rogers investigated the degree of cognitive impairment in autistic individuals with an emphasis on illuminating the latency in executive functioning. Findings suggested a hindrance in temporal order, source, free recall and working memory. However, their participants did exhibit capable short and long-term memory, cued recall and the capacity to learn new material. In sum, they suggested that there is both a general deficit in global working memory and a specific impairment in social intelligence where the former is exacerbated by the latter and vice versa.

Other evidence points towards unique mnemonic strategies used by autistic individuals wherein they rely less on semantic associative networks and are less constricted by conventional word-word associations (ex. Orange-Apple). This may be due to abnormalities in MTL regions. Thus, autistic individuals may have the capacity for more abstract but robust associations. Firth addresses this with the term "weak Central Coherence", meaning a reduced tendency for processing information in context and integration of higher-level meaning. This may explain why autistic individuals have a heightened capacity for noticing seemingly disjointed details. For example, in the Embedded Figures Test (EFT) autistic individuals exhibited a faster and heightened ability to locate the target because of their diminished reliance on global perception.
In a study conducted on autistic children, it was shown that neurocognition influences word learning in autistic children. The process of syntactic development requires a child to match co-occurrences of words or parts of words (morphemes) and their meanings. This process can depend on working memory. The limited short term verbal memory paired with working memory may be the reason of language delay in children with autism. According to the result of this experiment the group with autism was able to perform the part of the test with nonlinguistic cues which depended on working memory but failed to pass short-term memory and the linguistic part of it. This explains the delay of language in autistic children and neurocognition is an important contributor to it.

Central executive or executive functioning 
The symptoms associated with autism spectrum disorders are thought to be greatly impacted by a dysfunction in working memory. In examining autism through the lens of Baddeley & Hitch's model of working memory there have been conflicting results in research. Some studies have shown that individuals that fall within the spectrum have impaired executive functioning which means working memory does not function correctly. However, other studies have failed to find an effect in autistic people with a high level of functioning. Tests such as the Wisconsin Card Sorting Test have been administered to autistic individuals and the lower scores have been interpreted as indicative of a poor ability to focus on relevant information and thus a deficit within the central executive aspect of working memory. An aspect of ASD is that it might be present, to a certain extent, in first degree relatives. One study found that siblings of autistic individuals have limited ability to focus and conceptualize categories using updated information. Given these results, it is reasonable to suggest that these so-called deficits in cognitive ability are of the cognitive endophenotypes (i.e. relatives) of ASD.

Category integration 
Given these findings it would appear as if autistic individuals have trouble categorizing. Studies have shown that category induction is in fact possible and can occur at the same cognitive level as non-autistic individuals, however. Given that category formation aspects such as discrimination and feature detection are enhanced among autistic individuals it is viable to state that although autistic individuals require more trials and or time to learn material, and also may employ different learning strategies than non-autistic individuals, once learned, the level of categorization displayed is on par with a non-autistic individual.

The idea that autistic individuals learn differently than those without autism can account for the delay in their ability to categorize. However, once they begin categorizing they are at an average level of cognitive ability as compared to those without autism. This, however, is only applicable to higher functioning individuals within the spectrum as those with lower IQ levels are notoriously difficult to test and measure.

In part with a different style of learning, individuals within the spectrum have also been proposed to have a weak central coherence. This theory meshes well with the general traits of individuals within the spectrum. Again though, this is explained through different learning styles. As opposed to viewing a forest as a collection of trees, those with autism see one tree, and another tree, and another tree and thus it takes an immense amount of time to process complex tasks in comparison with non-autistic people. Weak central coherence can be used to explain what is viewed as a working memory deficit in attention or inhibition, as autistic individuals possess an intense focus on single parts of a complex, multi-part concept and cannot inhibit this in order to withdraw focus and direct it on the whole rather than a singular aspect. Thus, this suggests that the decrement in working memory is partially inherited which is then exacerbated by further genetic complications leading to a diagnosis of autism.

Visual and spatial memory 

Deficits in spatial working memory appear to be familial in people with autism, and probably even in their close relatives. Replication of movements by others, a task that requires spatial awareness and memory capacities, can also be difficult for autistic children and adults.

People with Asperger's Syndrome were found to have spatial working memory deficits compared with control subjects on the Executive-Golf Task, although these may be indicative of a more general deficit in non-verbal intelligence in people with ASD. Despite these results, autistic children have been found to be superior to typically developing children in certain tasks, such as map learning and cued path recall regarding a navigated real-life labyrinth. Steele et al. attempt to explain this discrepancy by advancing the theory that the performance of autistic people on spatial memory tasks degrades faster in the face of increasing task difficulty, when compared with normally developed individuals. These results suggest that working memory is related with an individual's ability to solve problems, and that autism is a hindrance in this area.

Autistic people appear to have a local bias for visual information processing, that is, a preference for processing local features (details, parts) rather than global features (the whole). One explanation for this local bias is that people with autism do not have the normal global precedence when looking at objects and scenes. Alternatively, autism could bring about limitations in the complexity of information that can be manipulated in short-term visual memory during graphic planning.

The difficulties that individuals with ASD often have in regards to facial recognition has prompted further questions. Some research has shown that the fusiform gyrus in ASD individuals acts differently from in non-ASD individuals which may explain the aforementioned troubles regarding facial recognition.

Research by Baltruschat et al. has shown that improvement in spatial working memory for autistic individuals may be possible. Adapting a behaviorist approach by using positive reinforcement could increase WM efficiency in young children with ASD.

Auditory and phonological memory 

The research on phonological working memory in autism is extensive and at times conflicting. Some research has found that, in comparison with spatial memory, verbal memory and inner speech use remain relatively spared, while other studies have found limitations on the use of inner speech by autistic people. Others have found a benefit to phonological processing in autism when compared with semantic processing, and attribute the results to a similar developmental abnormality to that in savant syndrome.

In particular, Whitehouse et al. have found that autistic children, when compared with typically developing (TD) children of a similar mean verbal age and reading ability, performed better when asked to recall a set of pictures presented to them, but not as well when asked to recall a set of printed words presented interspersed with the pictures; a competing verbal task given to both sets of participants also worsened performance on control children more than it did on autistic children. They also reported that word length effects were greater for the control group. These results are contested by Williams, Happé, and Jarrold, who contend that it may be verbal IQ, rather than verbal ability, that is at issue, and Whitehouse et al.'s subjects were not matched on chronological age. Williams, Happé, and Jarrold themselves found no difference between autistic children and controls on a serial recall task where phonological similarity effects, rather than word length effects, were used as an alternate measure of inner speech use.

Joseph et al. found that a self-ordered pointing task in autistic children involving stimuli that could be remembered as words (e.g. shovel, cat) was impaired relative to comparison children, but the same task with abstract stimuli was not impaired in autistic children. In contrast, Williams et al. found that autistic children scored significantly lower than TD children on spatial memory tests. Williams et al. not only experimented with spatial memory tasks, but verbal memory as well. They discovered that in an experimental group and a control group of TD individuals, that while differences were found in spatial memory ability, no significant difference was seen between the groups regarding verbal memory. They ran their experiments with both children and adult participants. Autism is a developmental disorder, so it is possible that life experiences could alter the memory performance in adults who had grown up with autism. Williams et al. experimented with children separately to see if they had different results from their adult counterparts. They used a WRAML (Wide Range Assessment of Memory and Learning) test, a test specifically designed to test memory in children. Test results were similar across all age groups, that significant differences between TD and autistic participants are found only in spatial memory, not verbal working memory.

Gabig et al. discovered that children with autism, regarding verbal working memory and story retelling, performed worse than a control group of TD children. In three separate tasks designed to test verbal working memory, the autistic children scored well below the expected levels for their age. While results do show lower scores for autistic children, there was also information that suggested lack of vocabulary contributed to the lower scores, rather than working memory itself.

There is some evidence from an fMRI study that autistic individuals are more likely to use visual cues rather than verbal cues on some working memory tasks, based on the differentially high activation of right parietal regions over left parietal regions in an N-back working memory task with letters.

Opposing results 
Some data has shown that individuals with ASD may not have WM impairments and that this supposed impairment observed is a result of testing. Nakahachi et al. argue that the vagueness of many tests measuring WM levels in people with ASD. They found that people with ASD only performed worse on WM tests if the test itself could have interfered with the completion of the test. These findings show that the type of test and the way it is presented given to individuals with ASD can strongly affect the results, therefore much caution should be taken in choosing the design of a study focusing on WM in people with ASD.

Ozonoff et al. have found similar results in their studies on working memory in individuals with ASD. Their research showed no significant difference between individuals with ASD and those without ASD in tests designed to measure various aspects of working memory. This supports the notion that Autism does not inhibit WM. Results from experiments that have shown lower WM facilities in ASD individuals may be due to the human interaction nature of these experiments as individuals with ASD exhibit low social functioning skills. Experiments utilizing computer rather than human interaction remove this problem and may head more accurate findings.

Further research by Griffith et al. also indicates that WM may not be impaired in those with autism. There may be some executive function impairments in these individuals, but not in working memory and rather in social and language skills, which can effect education early in life. Other research conducted by Griffith et al. on young autistic individuals did not measure verbal working abilities, but nonetheless found no significant difference between the executive functions in autistic and non-autistic individuals. Though there has been much research that alludes to low WM abilities in those with autism, these recent data weaken the argument that autistic individuals have little WM facilities.

See also 
 Autism and memory
 Monotropism

References 

Autism
Memory